Marga is a district (kecamatan) of Tabanan Regency, Bali, Indonesia.

It is the location of the Battle of Margarana, where Indonesian National Hero I Gusti Ngurah Rai was killed by Dutch forces during the Indonesian Revolution. This battle, in which 96 Indonesians were killed, has been characterized by Balinese writers as a Puputan, such as those of 1906–08.

Footnotes

References 

 

Districts of Bali